The 1961 Nordic Athletics Championships was the inaugural edition of the international athletics competition between Nordic countries and was held in Oslo, Norway. It consisted of 34 individual athletics events, 22 for men and 12 for women. This covered a track and field programme plus a men's marathon race.

Finland topped the men's points classification with 190.5 points, while Sweden won the first women's team title with 89 points. Iceland took part in the men's competition only and was the only nation not to have an athlete top the podium. Among the athletes in attendance were 1956 Olympic medalists Vilhjálmur Einarsson and Jorma Valkama and 1960 Olympic medalist Eeles Landström.

Nina Hansen was the most successful athlete of the tournament, taking the women's titles in 80 metres hurdles, long jump and women's pentathlon for Denmark. Carl Fredrik Bunæs and Ulla-Britt Wieslander won 100 metres/200 metres sprint doubles in the men's and women's sections, respectively. Dan Waern of Sweden had a middle-distance track double and Finland's Reijo Höykinpuro similarly completed a long-distance track double.

Medal summary

Men

Women

Points table

Men

Women

References
Nordic Championships. GBR Athletics. Retrieved 2018-04-29.

1961
Nordic Championships
Nordic Championships
International sports competitions in Oslo
1960s in Oslo
International athletics competitions hosted by Norway